Brandon Tennant (born July 2, 1991) is a Canadian football defensive lineman, who is currently playing for the Winnipeg BlueBombers. He was drafted by the Roughriders in the seventh round of the 2015 CFL Draft, 59th overall. He played CIS football for the Laval Rouge et Or from 2011 to 2014, where he won two Vanier Cup championships.

References

External links
Saskatchewan Roughriders profile 

1991 births
Living people
Canadian football defensive linemen
Laval Rouge et Or football players
People from Lachine, Quebec
Players of Canadian football from Quebec
Saskatchewan Roughriders players
Canadian football people from Montreal